Sheridan Aubrey John Senior (born March 2, 1936, in Port Elizabeth, Newfoundland) was a Canadian politician. He represented the electoral district of Grand Falls in the Newfoundland and Labrador House of Assembly from 1971 to 1975. He was a member of the Progressive Conservative Party of Newfoundland and Labrador, was appointed Minister of Community and Social Development and served as Provincial Director of the Progressive Conservative Party. Before politics, he was a school teacher, proprietor of "Trader John" Wholesale and Retail. After politics, he worked in the financial services industry and received the Chartered Financial Planner (CFP) designation. He had two children: Sheridan Paul Senior and Jason Craig Senior. He plays guitar, organ, piano, and the accordion. Since retirement, he and his wife dedicate their time to entertaining senior citizens and others with live musical performances.

References

1936 births
Living people
Progressive Conservative Party of Newfoundland and Labrador MHAs